National Route 15 is a national highway in South Korea connects Goheung County to Damyang County. It established on 31 August 1971.

Main stopovers
 South Jeolla Province
 Goheung County - Boseong County - Suncheon - Boseong County - Hwasun County - Gokseong County - Damyang County

Major intersections

 (■): Motorway
IS: Intersection, IC: Interchange

South Jeolla Province

References

15
Roads in South Jeolla